Aniket Arpon Parikh (born 7 July 1997) is a New Zealand cricketer.  He made his first-class debut for Auckland on 25 February 2017 in the 2016–17 Plunket Shield season. Prior to his debut, he was named in New Zealand's squad for the 2016 Under-19 Cricket World Cup.

He made his List A debut for New Zealand XI against Pakistan on 3 January 2018.

References

External links
 

1997 births
Living people
New Zealand cricketers
Auckland cricketers
Cricketers from Gujarat
People from Rajkot
Indian emigrants to New Zealand